Epitaph is the eighth studio album by Irish post-rock band God Is An Astronaut. It was released through Napalm Records  on April 27, 2018. It is the final album to feature keyboardist Jamie Dean, who left the band in 2017 to pursue his own music and projects.

Themes
Epitaph's theme is death, inspired by the passing of the 7-year-old cousin of Torsten and Niels Kinsella. Oisín, the record's final track, was written on the day they received the news of the child's death.

Track listing

Reception

Upon release the album received generally positive reviews among critics. Jadranka Balaš of Hardwired Magazine wrote that Epitaph, "is a heavy, dark record, filled with sorrow and melancholy, at least in major parts. One of those who leaves you drained, but somehow with ease because you’ve released all those feelings out of you." Max Morin of Exclaim! stated in his review that the band have, "... yet to top All Is Violent, All Is Bright, but Epitaph is the closest they've come yet."

Personnel
 God Is An Astronaut 
 Torsten Kinsella - guitars, keyboards, vocals, programming
 Niels Kinsella - bass
 Lloyd Hanney - drums

 Production

 God Is An Astronaut - Production and mixing
 Xenon Field - Post Production and programming
 Tim Young - Mastering 
 Fursy Teyssier - Artwork

 Additional musicians
 Jimmy Scanlon - Additional Guitar on all songs except "Oisín"
 Jamie Dean - Additional Piano/Keys on "Epitaph," "Mortal Coil," and "Winter Dusk/Awakening"
 Brian Harris - Additional Guitar on "Mortal Coil"

References

2018 albums
God Is an Astronaut albums
Napalm Records albums